The white-browed chat-tyrant (Ochthoeca leucophrys) is a species of bird in the family Tyrannidae. It is found in the Puna grassland.

Its natural habitat is subtropical or tropical high-altitude shrubland.

Gallery

References

white-browed chat-tyrant
Birds of the Puna grassland
white-browed chat-tyrant
Taxonomy articles created by Polbot